is a former Japanese male volleyball player. He was part of the Japan men's national volleyball team. He competed with the national team at the 2008 Summer Olympics in Beijing, China.

He also participated in the 2020 Summer Olympics in Tokyo in beach volleyball.

See also
 Japan at the 2008 Summer Olympics

References

External links
 
 
 

1984 births
Living people
Japanese men's volleyball players
People from Saitama Prefecture
Sportspeople from Saitama Prefecture
Volleyball players at the 2008 Summer Olympics
Olympic volleyball players of Japan
Volleyball players at the 2006 Asian Games
Volleyball players at the 2010 Asian Games
Asian Games medalists in volleyball
Medalists at the 2010 Asian Games
Asian Games gold medalists for Japan
Beach volleyball players at the 2020 Summer Olympics
21st-century Japanese people